N'Gattakro (also spelled Ngatakro) is a town in east-central Ivory Coast. It is a sub-prefecture of Daoukro Department in Iffou Region, Lacs District. The town is 16 kilometres to the west of the border of Comoé District.

N'Gattakro was a commune until March 2012, when it became one of 1126 communes nationwide that were abolished.

In 2014, the population of the sub-prefecture of N'Gattakro was 13,480.

Villages
The 5 villages of the sub-prefecture of N'Gattakro and their population in 2014 are:
 Adjékro (4 151)
 Akakro (2 081)
 Amoikonkro (2 183)
 N'gattakro (3 767)
 N'tèkléfè (1 298)

References

Sub-prefectures of Iffou
Former communes of Ivory Coast